Novillidius is a genus of beetles in the family Carabidae, containing the following species:

 Novillidius marginellus Straneo, 1943
 Novillidius muelleri Straneo, 1941
 Novillidius rectibasis Straneo, 1979

References

Pterostichinae